Hanback was a small settlement in Norton County, Kansas, United States.

History
Hanback was issued a post office in 1884. The post office was discontinued in 1892.

References

Former populated places in Norton County, Kansas
Former populated places in Kansas